Regional elections were held in Denmark on 5 May 1943. 10569 municipal council members were elected, as well as 299 members of the amts of Denmark.
In the amts of Southern Jutland, there wasn't an election in 1943, but the numbers from the previous election were recorded again.

Results
The results of the regional elections:

Amt Councils

Municipal Councils

References

Local and municipal elections in Denmark
Local